The longnose catshark (Apristurus kampae) is a catshark of the family Scyliorhinidae found in the eastern central Pacific from central and southern California and the Gulf of California, between latitudes 38° N and 23° N, at depths down to 1,890.  Its length is up to 58 cm.

Etymology
The catshark is named in honor of Elizabeth Kampa Boden (1922–1986), of the Scripps Institution of Oceanography, who was chief scientist aboard RV Argos, from which the type specimen was collected.

References

 

longnose catshark
Western North American coastal fauna
Fish of the Gulf of California
Taxa named by Leighton R. Taylor
longnose catshark